Tokhoy is a rural locality (an ulus) in Selenginsky District, Republic of Buryatia, Russia. The population was 2,819 as of 2010. There are 68 streets.

Geography 
Tokhoy is located 13 km northeast of Gusinoozyorsk (the district's administrative centre) by road. Zhargalanta is the nearest rural locality.

References 

Rural localities in Selenginsky District